Caloptilia glyphidopis is a moth of the family Gracillariidae. It is known from Fiji.

References

glyphidopis
Moths described in 1934
Moths of Fiji